Slavonia was a  passenger ship that was built in 1902 as Yamuna for the British India Line. She was sold to the Cunard Line in 1903 and renamed Slavonia. She was wrecked in the Azores in 1909, but sent out the first SOS message. All on board were rescued.

Description
Accommodation for 40 first class and 800 steerage class passengers was provided.

History
Yamuna was built as yard number 600 by Sir J. Laing & Co Ltd, Sunderland, County Durham for the British India Steam Navigation Company. She was launched on 15 November 1902, when she was christened by Lady Stewart (wife of Lieutenant-General Sir Richard Stewart), and completed in June 1903. She was the largest ship built at a British shipyard for eleven years, and the largest ever to be launched on the River Wear. The United Kingdom Official Number 115761 was allocated. In 1904, she was sold to the Cunard Line and renamed Slavonia. She was used on the service between the Mediterranean and New York, United States. This service had been introduced as a temporary measure in the autumn of 1903 and was subsequently made permanent. Its port of registry was Liverpool, Lancashire. Accommodation for 71 first class, 74 second class and 1,954 steerage class passengers was provided. Her crew numbered 225. Lifesaving equipment comprised twelve lifeboats, seven collapsible lifeboats and two other boats. She carried 24 lifebuoys and 2,340 lifebelts. Slavonia made her maiden voyage for Cunard Line on 17 March 1904, sailing from Sunderland to New York via Trieste and Fiume, Austrian Empire and Palermo, Italy.

Shipwreck

Slavonia departed from New York City on 3 June 1909 on what would be her final voyage. On 10 June, Slavonia ran aground in foggy weather at Ponta dos Fenais, Flores, Azores, Portugal. An SOS was sent, the first use of this code. Prinzess Irene took off 110 cabin class passengers. Batavia took off 300 steerage class passengers, leaving the crew on board. They left the ship later that day. The wreck was subsequently looted. Prinzess Irene landed some of the rescued passengers at Gibraltar. The 84 remaining on board travelled on to Naples, Italy, where they arrived on 17 June. Those rescued by Batavia reached Naples on 19 June.

Slavonia was abandoned and declared a total loss. She was insured for £90,000. Some of her cargo was salvaged - 400 bags of coffee, 1,000 ingots of copper and 200 casks of oil. Also salvaged were 25 pieces of agricultural machinery and miscellaneous ships' stores. A Board of Trade inquiry was held into the loss of Slavonia. The Board of Trade awarded the captains of Batavia and Prinzess Irene a piece of plate in recognition of their efforts to rescue the passengers of Slavonia. The person in charge of the wireless station on Flores also received a piece of plate. His two assistants were awarded a sum of money each.

References

External links
 Photo of RMS Slavonia

 

1902 ships
Ships built on the River Wear
Passenger ships of the United Kingdom
Shipwrecks of the Azores
Maritime incidents in 1909